Lai da Nalps is a reservoir in the municipality of Tujetsch, Grisons, Switzerland. It has a capacity of 45 million m³ and a surface area of 0.91 km². The reservoir is connected to Lai da Sontga Maria and Lai da Curnera in neighboring valleys.

See also
List of lakes of Switzerland
List of mountain lakes of Switzerland

External links

Lakes of Graubünden
Reservoirs in Switzerland
RLaidaNalps
Tujetsch